The black-winged cuckooshrike (Lalage melaschistos), also known as lesser grey cuckooshrike or dark grey cuckooshrike, is a species of cuckooshrike found in South to Southeast Asia. Despite the name, they (cuckooshrikes) are unrelated to shrikes or cuckoos. They have broad based bills with grey upper parts, black wings, white vent, graduated white-tipped tails, black bills and legs. Females are overall lighter in all taxa.

Distribution
They breed in summer in mountains from 300–2450 meters and migrate altitudinally or south in winter. It is distributed from Northeast Pakistan through the lower Himalayan region (Uttarakhand, Nepal, Arunachal Pradesh and into the hills of NE Myanmar continuing to China and Southeast Asia.  It winters in the foothills, occasionally longer distances south west to northern parts of peninsular India and east to Orissa, Bengal and Bangladesh, but may travel as far south as Kerala).

Habitat: Breeds in deciduous and broad-leaved evergreen forest but winters in open forest, groves, singly or in pairs. They are also known to join mixed feeding parties. Their diet consists mainly of caterpillars, beetles and other bugs.

Description

A medium-sized, dark cuckoo-shrike with unbarred, grey underparts.
Male: dark grey above; contrasting black wings and tail. Wide white feather tips on underside of tail.
Female: Palers with faint barring on underside
Call: Loud twit twit to we, descending in scale.
Diet: mainly invertebrates.
Nests in tree.

References

black-winged cuckooshrike
Birds of China
Birds of the Himalayas
Birds of Southeast Asia
black-winged cuckooshrike